Stoja Novaković (born 4 June 1972), known mononymously as Stoja, is a Serbian hardcore-folk singer. Recognised as one of the most popular turbo-folk performers, Stoja is noted for her strong voice and often eccentric appearances.

She released her first album, Kako je meni sada, in Lazarević Production in 1998. Later, she released her albums in the record label Grand Production. Within a short time, Stoja became one of the most popular singers in the Balkans. She is currently signed to BN Music, and has recently released songs with IDJ and Balkan Star too.

Early life

Novaković was born in the village of Perlez, in the Zrenjanin municipality in northern Serbia. Her father was born in Pukiš, a village in the Lopare municipality in northeastern Bosnia and Herzegovina. She was raised in Perlez, where she lived until the age of 25.

She is said to have received her uncommon and strong voice from her father, Milan. Her father was not supportive of her singing career and they didn't speak for years because she decided to pursue that career path. It was only after her mother intervened that they reconciled.

Career
Novaković began singing as an amateur in kafanas and discothèques in 1987. In 1997 she began recording an album for the record label Lazarević Produktion. Kako je meni sada, her debut studio album, was released in 1998. That first album became a big success. Later that year, she signed with the label Grand Production, owned by Lepa Brena, and released her second album, Ćiki, ćiki in 1999. The album featured multiple hit songs, the biggest being "Ćiki, ćiki".

One of Stoja's greatest hits, song Evropa, can be heard in episode 19 of Bosnian TV series Viza za budućnost; that is when many people in BiH got known and started to listen Stoja, and since then she has been notably popular in this country of former Yugoslavia; Stoja herself uploaded the mentioned insert from the series on her official YouTube channel.

Stoja released the EP Osveta with two songs in 2006 with the band Južni Vetar.

The song "Revolucija" (Revolution) and its music video were both released in October 2010. The video caused some stir in the media because it featured Stoja bathing in a bathtub full of peppers.

Her tenth studio album entitled Nije da nije (It's Not That It's Not) was released on 6 May 2013 by the Bosnia-based label BN Music, marking the first time in 15 years that Stoja has released an album with a production company other than Grand Production.

Following the release of Nije da nije, Stoja began releasing non-album singles including "Bela ciganka", "Ola ola", "Takvog dečka hoću ja", "Lila lila", and "Ti brate imaš sve".

Album Bela ciganka was released in 2015; it includes old hits, as well as new such as "Kao ovde nigde nije" (first song, displayed on cover). Two singles were released the next year: "Ponovo" and "Ko preživi neka priča".

In the following period, singles with music videos are released by Stoja: "Bomba" (2017), "Samo jako" (ft Relja and Coby, 2017), "Ne treba mi život" (2017), "Čista hemija" (music video in which she is dressed like Gaddafi; ft Coby, 2018), "Ko bi rekao" (ft Kija, 2018), "Idi mami pa se žali" (2019), "Žena sa Balkana" (ft Mimi Mercedez, 2019), "Svet se vrti oko nas" (ft Mimi Mercedez, 2019), "Taki taki" (2019), "Neka pati" (ft Milan, 2019) and "Aj, chiki, chiki" (ft Ludi Srbi, 2019). Geto Gerila made a remix of her song "Džek" (Naj, naj album, 2009) entitled "Ostani tu" and published on 27 October 2019. The last release in 2019 was Geto Gerila remix of Stoja's hit "Ćiki, ćiki" (same-named album, 1999) entitled "Aj, chiki, chiki" and published on 20 December. Stoja had announced release of song "Lice" which was not published then because of 2019–20 coronavirus pandemic; the song was published in June 2020. In June 2021 she released song "Hera" with Balkan Star label.

Stoja has been working with her long-time friend and lyricist Stevan Simeunović who is author of almost all her songs since her career has started.

Personal life

Novaković was first married at age 16, became a mother at 17 and was widowed at 19 when her first husband lost his life in a 1991 car crash, ending their three-year marriage. The period after his death was financially difficult for her. She was quoted as saying "I was very poor. I did not have anything to eat." She became a grandmother at age 33 when her son Milan's first child was born.

Since 2007, she has lived in Belgrade, more specifically the Bežanijska kosa neighborhood in New Belgrade. Novaković married architect Igor Jovanović 1 November 2009, after being in a relationship for five years. Their relationship has been on-again-off-again, with the couple constantly breaking up and getting back together. In a March 2014 interview, Novaković revealed that she once attempted suicide by driving her car into a wall to keep their marriage from dissipating.

On 4 October 2011, Stoja found her mother Katica, who had heart problems and diabetes, dead in bed after being suspicious when Katica did not emerge from her bedroom that morning.

Stoja survived a car accident on 28 May 2012 when her car was totaled after being hit by a truck. She escaped with a minor injury to the forehead.

Stoja has said that her favorite singer is Šemsa Suljaković and she has frequently covered Suljaković's songs at concerts and television appearances, and was even interviewed with her in June 2012.

Discography
Kako je meni sada (1998)
Ćiki, ćiki (1999)
Samo (2000)
Evropa (2001)
Zakletva (2003)
Starija (2004)
Metak (2006)
Do gole kože (2008)
Naj, naj (2009)
Nije da nije (2013)
Bela ciganka (2015)

Videography
Starija (2004)
Metak (2006)
Ja te Mićo ne volim (2008)
Do gole kože (2008)
Kučka (2008)
Pogrešna (2009)
Da li si za sex? (2009)
Kakva sam, takva sam (2010)
Živi i uživaj (2010)
Revolucija (2010)
Pare, pare (2012)
Ti brate imas sve (2015)
Samo Jako (2017)
Ne treba mi zivot (2018)
Cista Hemija (2018)
Ko bi rekao (2018)
Zena sa Balkana (2019)
Taki, Taki (2019)
Neka pati (2019)
Ostani tu (2019)
Aj, chiki, chiki (2019)
Lice (2020)
Hera (2021)

Notes

References

Sources

External links

1972 births
Living people
People from Zrenjanin
20th-century Serbian women singers
Serbian turbo-folk singers
Grand Production artists
BN Music artists
Serbian people of Bosnia and Herzegovina descent
21st-century Serbian women singers